Milan Žemlička (born 20 October 1996) is a Czech biathlete who represented the Czech Republic at the 2022 Winter Olympics.

References

Living people
1996 births
Czech male biathletes
People from Chrudim
Biathletes at the 2022 Winter Olympics
Olympic biathletes of the Czech Republic
Sportspeople from the Pardubice Region